Endotricha bradleyi is a species of snout moth in the genus Endotricha. It was described by Paul E. S. Whalley in 1962, and is known from the Solomon Islands.

References

Endotrichini
Moths described in 1962